This article lists various football records in relation to the Australia national football team. The page is updated where necessary after each Australia match, and is correct as of 3 December 2022.

Individual appearances

Appearances
 Most appearances
 Mark Schwarzer, 109, 31 July 1993 – 7 September 2013
 Tim Cahill, 108, 30 March 2004 – 20 November 2018
 Lucas Neill, 96, 9 October 1996 – 19 September 2013
 Brett Emerton, 95, 7 February 1998 – 9 December 2012
 Alex Tobin, 87, 9 March 1988 – 6 November 1998
 Marco Bresciano, 84, 1 June 2001 – 22 January 2015
 Paul Wade, 84, 3 August 1986 – 1 November 1996
 Mark Milligan, 80, 7 June 2006 – 19 October 2019
 Luke Wilkshire, 80, 9 October 2004 – 26 May 2014
 Mile Jedinak, 79, 22 March 2008 – 26 June 2018
 Mathew Ryan, 79, 5 December 2012 – 3 December 2022

 First player to reach 100 appearances
 Mark Schwarzer, 6 September 2012, 3–0 vs. Lebanon

 Fastest player to reach 100 appearances
 Tim Cahill, 30 March 2004 – 25 June 2017

 Most consecutive appearances
 Alex Tobin, 63, 4 November 1970 – 30 October 1977

 Most appearances as a substitute
 Archie Thompson, 34, 28 February 2001 – 7 September 2013

 Most consecutive appearances as a substitute
 Mark Jankovics, 6, 15 June 1980 – 2 December 1980

 Most appearances as a substitute without ever starting a game
 Jim Campbell, 4, 27 January 1983 – 18 December 1983

 Most appearances in competitive matches (World Cup, Confederations Cup, Asian Cup, Nations Cup and qualifier)
 Mark Schwarzer, 61, 15 August 1993 – 18 June 2013

 Longest Australia career
 Mark Schwarzer, 20 years, 38 days, 31 July 1993 – 7 September 2013

 Shortest Australia career
 Raphael Bove, 1 minute, 6 November 1998, 0–0 vs. United States

 Most consecutive appearances comprising entire Australia career
 Alan Westwater, 14, 28 May 1967 – 4 April 1968

 Youngest player
 Duncan Cummings, 17 years, 139 days, 6 August 1975, vs. China

 Oldest player
 Mark Schwarzer, 40 years, 336 days, 7 September 2013, vs. Brazil

 Oldest debutant
 Bruno Fornaroli, 34 years, and 198 days, 24 March 2022, vs. Japan

 Most appearances at the World Cup finals
 Mathew Leckie, 10, 13 June 2014 – 3 December 2022
 Mathew Ryan, 10, 13 June 2014 – 3 December 2022

 Most appearances without ever playing at the World Cup finals
 Alex Tobin, 87, 9 March 1988 – 6 November 1999

 Most appearances at the Asian Cup finals
 Tim Cahill, 16, 8 July 2007 – 27 January 2015

 Most consecutive years of appearances
 Tim Cahill, 14, 2004 to 2018 inclusive

 Longest gap between appearances
 Ted Drain, 8 years, 74 days, 10 May 1947, 1–2 vs. South Africa – 24 September 1955, 0–6 vs. South Africa

 Most appearances by a set of brothers
 Aurelio and Tony Vidmar, 120, 1991 – 2006

 Capped by another country
 Ken Hough (New Zealand)
 Apostolos Giannou (Greece)

Goals

 First goal
 William Maunder, 17 June 1922, vs. New Zealand

 Most goals
 Tim Cahill, 50, 31 May 2004 – 10 October 2017

 Most goals in competitive matches (World Cup, Nations Cup, Asian Cup and qualifiers)
 Tim Cahill, 39, 2 June 2004 – 10 October 2017

 Most goals in a match
 Archie Thompson, 13, 11 April 2001, vs. American Samoa

 Four goals or more in a match on the greatest number of occasions
 George Smith, Damian Mori, twice

 Three goals or more in a match on the greatest number of occasions
 Damian Mori, four times

 Scoring in most consecutive appearances
 George Smith, 5, 5 June 1933 – 11 July 1936
 Jack Hughes, 5, 3 September 1938 – 1 October 1938
 Jim Cunningham, 5, 31 May 1947 – 28 August 1948

 Most goals on debut
 Frank Parsons, 3, 14 August 1948, 6–0 vs. New Zealand
 Ian Hunter, 3, 26 February 1980, 11–2 vs. Papua New Guinea

 Most appearances, scoring in every match
 Jack Hughes, 6, 17 June 1933 – 1 October 1938

 Most goals in a World Cup tournament
 Tim Cahill, 2, 2006 World Cup
 Brett Holman, 2, 2010 World Cup
 Tim Cahill 2, 2014 World Cup
 Mile Jedinak, 2, 2018 World Cup

 Most goals in total at World Cup tournaments
 Tim Cahill, 5, 12 June 2006 – 18 June 2014

 First goal in a World Cup finals match
 Tim Cahill, 12 June 2006, 3–1 vs. Japan

 First goal in a World Cup qualifying campaign
 Les Scheinflug, 21 November 1965, 1–6 vs. North Korea
 Youngest goalscorer
 Duncan Cummings, 17 years, 139 days, 6 August 1975, vs. China

 Oldest goalscorer
 Tim Cahill, 37 years, 308 days, 10 June 2017, vs. Syria

 First goal by a substitute
 Ian Johnston, 8 December 1965, vs. Malaysia

 First player to score a hat-trick
 George Smith, 17 June 1933, 6–4 vs. New Zealand

 Most appearances for an outfield player without ever scoring
 Stan Lazaridis, 60, 15 April 1993 – 7 October 2006

 Most different goalscorers in a match
 9, 9 April 2001, 22–0 vs. Tonga

 Most goals against the same opponent
 George Smith, 16 vs. New Zealand, 5 June 1933 – 18 July 1936

 Highest goals to games average
 George Smith, 16 goals in 6 games, average 2.66 goals per game.

Captains
 First captain
 Alex Gibb, 17 June 1922, vs. New Zealand

 Most appearances as captain
 Peter Wilson and Lucas Neill, both 61

Discipline
 Most red cards
 Ray Richards and Brett Emerton, 2 each

 List of all Australia players sent off

Team records
 Biggest victory
 31–0 vs. American Samoa, 11 April 2001

 Heaviest defeat
 0–8 vs. South Africa, 17 September 1955

 Biggest away victory
 10–0 vs. New Zealand, 11 July 1936

 Biggest away defeat
 0–7 vs. Croatia, 25 September 1998

 Biggest victory at the World Cup finals
 3–1 vs. Japan, 12 June 2006

 Heaviest defeat at the World Cup finals
 0–4 vs. Germany, 13 June 2010

 Biggest victory at the OFC Nations Cup finals
 17–0 vs. Cook Islands, 19 June 2000

 First defeat to a non-Oceania team
 0–1 vs. Canada, 14 June 1924

 Most consecutive victories
 14, 26 October 1996 vs. Tahiti – 1 October 1997 vs. Tunisia

 Most consecutive matches without defeat
 20, 21 September 1996 vs. Kuwait – 12 December 1997 vs. Mexico

 Most consecutive matches without victory
 7, 31 May 1980 – 11 November 1980

 Most consecutive defeats
 5, 3 September 1955 to 1 October 1955

 Most consecutive draws
 4, Achieved on two occasions, most recently 6 October 2016 – 23 March 2017

 Most consecutive matches without scoring
 4, Achieved on four occasions, most recently 25 February 1996 – 23 April 1996

 Most consecutive matches without conceding a goal
 6, Achieved on two occasions, most recently 17 November 2007 – 1 June 2008

Miscellaneous
 First substitute
 Arthur McCartney (for Cliff Almond), 10 September 1955, 0–2 vs. South Africa

 Australia players who later became manager/head coach
 Les Scheinflug, 6 appearances as a player, 1965–1968, 19 matches as manager, 1974–1994
 Frank Farina, 37 appearances as a player, 1984–1995, 58 matches as manager, 1999–2005
 Graham Arnold, 54 appearances as a player, 1985–1997, 23 matches as manager, 2006–2019
 Aurelio Vidmar, 44 appearances as a player, 1991–2001, 1 match as manager, 2013
 Ange Postecoglou, 4 appearances as a player, 1986, 49 matches as manager, 2013–2017
 Graham Arnold, 54 appearances as a player, 1985–1997, ongoing as manager, 2018–present

 Father and son both capped
 Alex Gibb (6 caps, 1922–1923) and Lex Gibb (8 caps, 1938–1948)
 Percy Lennard (3 caps, 1923) and Jack Lennard (6 caps, 1954–1956)
 Andy Henderson (2 caps, 1924) and Bill Henderson (6 caps, 1954–1956)
 Cliff van Blerk (2 caps, 1967) and Jason van Blerk (27 caps, 1990–2000)
 John Coyne (4 caps, 1979–1980) and Chris Coyne (7 caps, 2008–2009)
 Vic Bozanic (1 cap, 1980) and Oliver Bozanic (7 caps, 2013–)
 Alan Davidson (51 caps, 1980–1993) and Jason Davidson (22 caps, 2012–2015)

See also

 Australia at the FIFA World Cup
 Australia at the FIFA Confederations Cup
 Australia at the OFC Nations Cup
 Australia at the AFC Asian Cup

References
General

 

 

 

Inline citations

Notes

Australia national soccer team records and statistics
National association football team records and statistics